A mass grave is a grave containing multiple human corpses, which may or may not be identified prior to burial. The United Nations has defined a criminal mass grave as a burial site containing three or more victims of execution, although an exact definition is not unanimously agreed upon. Mass graves are usually created after many people die or are killed, and there is a desire to bury the corpses quickly for sanitation concerns. Although mass graves can be used during major conflicts such as war and crime, in modern times they may be used after a famine, epidemic, or natural disaster. In disasters, mass graves are used for infection and disease control. In such cases, there is often a breakdown of the social infrastructure that would enable proper identification and disposal of individual bodies.

History

Mass or communal burial was a common practice before the development of a dependable crematory chamber by Ludovico Brunetti in 1873. In ancient Rome waste and dead bodies of the poor were dumped into mass graves called puticuli.

In Paris, the practice of mass burial, and in particular, the condition of the Cimetière des Innocents, led Louis XVI to eliminate Parisian cemeteries.  The remains were removed and placed in the Paris underground forming the early Catacombs. Le Cimetière des Innocents alone had 6,000,000 dead to remove.  Burial commenced outside the city limits in what is now Père Lachaise Cemetery.

War

Mongol Invasion of Kievan Rus' 
A mass grave containing at least 300 bodies of victims of a Mongol invasion of Kievan Rus' in the year 1238, was discovered during an excavation in 2005, in Yaroslavl, Russia.

Thirty Years' War 
The Thirty Years' War, in the 17th century, was Europe's deadliest religious conflict. In the Battle of Lützen, 47 soldiers who perished were buried in a mass grave. Archaeological and osteological analyses found that the soldiers ranged in age from 15–50 years. Most corpses had evidence of blunt force trauma to the head while seven men had stabbing injuries. Most of the soldiers died from gunshot wounds inflicted by pistols and cavalry carbines.

Napoleonic Wars 
Several mass graves have been discovered that were the result of Napoleonic battles, mass graves were dug for expeditious disposal of deceased soldiers and horses. Often soldiers would plunder the substantial quantity of corpses prior to burial. Generally the mass graves were dug by soldiers or members of logistical corps. If these weren't available, the corpses would be left to rot or would be burned. Such examples have been found scattered throughout Europe.

Spanish Civil War 

There are over 2,000 known mass graves throughout Spain from the Spanish Civil War wherein an estimated 500,000 people died between 1936 and 1939, and approximately 135,000 were killed after the war ended. 

Exhumations are ongoing.  Some are conducted on the basis of information given in witnesses' and relatives' testimonies to the Asociación para la Recuperación de la Memoria Histórica (ARMH). These testimonies serve the purpose of helping geophysicists, archaeologists and forensic scientists to locate graves in order to identify bodies and allow families to rebury their relatives.

In the summer of 2008, information from these testimonies was used to unearth a 4 meter long square grave containing five skeletons near the town of San Juan del Monte. These five remains are believed to be of people that were kidnapped and killed after the July 18, 1936 military coup.

Another mass grave from the Spanish Civil War was found using Ground Penetrating Radar (GPR). Eyewitness accounts identified two potential locations for an unmarked grave in mountains of Lena in Northern Spain. Both sites were examined and an unmarked mass grave of approximately 1 meter by 5 meters was found.

2nd Sino Japanese War

Korean War 
Approximately 100,000–200,000 civilians were killed at the start of the Korean War. These people were flagged by the government of South Korea for potentially collaborating with or sympathizing with North Korea. They were arrested and subsequently executed without trial. The sites where the massacres occurred were forbidden to the public. The bodies were considered to be traitors and the act of associating with them was considered treasonous. Despite this, families retrieved bodies from the shallow forbidden mass graves at the massacre sites.

In 1956, bereaved families and villagers exhumed over 100 decomposed and unidentifiable bodies, ensuring that the complete human skeleton was intact. Each exhumed body was buried in its own "nameless grave" in a cemetery on Jeju Island. There is a granite memorial within the cemetery which bears the cemetery's local name, "Graves of One Hundred Ancestors and One Descendant." This name functions to express the opposite of how the genealogy should be as typically many descendants derive from one ancestor.

1973 Chilean coup d'état 
The Chilean military coup against President Salvador Allende occurred on September 11, 1973. The military surrounded the town of Santiago and searched for people hiding in potential guerilla insurgent locations. Civilians were detained for long periods of time and some disappeared. Following the coup, bodies were abundant in the streets and in the Mapocho River. It is estimated that 3,200 people were executed or disappeared between 1973 and 1990 in Chile. Higher estimates are up to 4,500 people. These bodies were taken to morgues to be identified and claimed. Unidentified bodies were buried in marked mass graves.

From this conflict, several hidden mass graves have been identified. In December 1978, 15 bodies were discovered in an abandoned limestone mine in Lonquén. In October 1979, 19 bodies were exhumed after being secretly buried at the cemetery of Yumbel. Mass graves were also identified in Santiago's General Cemetery with multiple bodies being forced into a single coffin. This cemetery had an influx of over 300 bodies within a three-month time span. These mass graves were distinguished by a cross with the initials "NN." "NN" is indicative of the phrase "Nomen Nescio" or "no name." Following extensive media coverage of these mass graves, the Chilean military decided to exhume the bodies from Lonquén, Yumbel, and Santiago's General Cemetery. The military airdropped the exhumed bodies over open water or remote mountain locations.

Turkish Invasion of Cyprus 
Many mass graves of both Turkish and Greek Cypriots were found in Cyprus after Turkey invaded the island in 1974. On August 3, 14 Greek Cypriot civilians were executed and buried in a mass grave. In Eptakomi 12 Greek Cypriots were found in a mass grave executed with their hands tied. On the other hand, during the Maratha, Santalaris and Aloda massacre, 126 Turkish Cypriots including elderly people and children were murdered by EOKA B and the inhabitants of the three villages were buried in mass graves with a bulldozer. The villagers of Maratha and Santalaris, 84 to 89 people in total, were buried in the same grave. Mass graves were used to bury Turkish Cypriot victims of Tochni massacre too.

1976 Argentine coup d'état 
On March 24, 1976 at 3:21 AM, the media told the people of Argentina that the country was now under the "operational control of the Junta of General Commanders of the Armed Forces."  This event and years following it became known as the 1976 Argentine coup d'état. President Isabel Perón had been taken captive two hours prior to the media announcement. The new dictatorship implemented travel bans, public gatherings, and a nighttime curfew. Additionally, the new dictatorship resulted in widespread violence, leading to executions and casualties.

Abducted captives were disposed of in one of the five defense zones within Argentina where they were held. The bodies were typically buried in individual marked anonymous graves. Three mass graves are known to exist on Argentinian police and military premises although other bodies were disposed of through cremation or by being airdropped over the Atlantic Ocean. Approximately 15,000 people are estimated to have been assassinated.

Argentina's largest mass grave's exhumation began in March 1984 at the San Vicente Cemetery in Cordoba. The grave was 3.5 meters deep and 25 by 2.5 meters across. It contained approximately 400 bodies. Of the recovered and exhumed bodies, 123 were of young people violently killed during the 1976–1983 dictatorship. The remaining bodies were identified as older and having died nonviolent deaths such as leprosy.

Vietnam War 
Many mass graves were discovered during the Vietnam War. In the fall of 1969, the body count unearthed from these mass graves was around 2,800. The victims buried in these mass graves included government officials, innocent civilians, women and children. They were tortured, executed and in some cases, buried alive.

In Quang Ngai, a mass grave of 10 soldiers was discovered on December 28, 2011. These soldiers were buried alongside their belongings including wallets, backpacks, guns, ammunition, mirrors, and combs.

Other larger mass graves of Vietnamese soldiers are believed to exist, with hundreds of soldiers in each grave.

Second Libyan Civil War 
The Second Libyan Civil War that began in 2014 is a proxy war between the UN-recognized Government of National Accord (GNA) of Fayez al-Sarraj and the Libyan National Army (LNA) of the militia leader Khalifa Haftar. In 2020, the GNA ousted the forces of Haftar, who is backed by the United Arab Emirates and Russia, and captured Tarhuna. The GNA discovered mass graves in the Harouda farm of the town that was under the control of the Kaniyat militiamen, who allied with Haftar in 2019. For a decade, the Kaniyat militia brutalized and killed more than a thousand civilians, where around 650 were murdered in 14 months under the UAE-backed Haftar forces. Thousands of holes were dug by government workers, where 120 bodies recovered. The unearthed remains were used by the families to identify the missing members and only 59 bodies were claimed. Survivors reported that the Kaniyat militia aligned with the UAE-backed Haftar tortured or electrocuted them. Many also reported being beaten by the militia.

Mass killings

Rwandan Genocide 

The Rwandan Genocide began after the unsolved death of the Rwandan president, Juvénal Habyarimana, on April 6, 1994. Extremist members of the Hutu government formed an interim wartime government. They called for an extermination of the Tutsi population, Hutu political opponents and Hutu whom resisted the violence. The genocide lasted 100 days and resulted in an estimated 800,000 killings.

Rwandan people sought refuge in gathering places such as churches and stadiums. An estimated 4,000–6,000 people gathered in Kibuye Catholic Church. Around April 17, 1994, the church was surrounded by armed civilians, police and gendarmes. Those inside were attacked with a variety of weapons including grenades, guns, and machetes. Survivors of the attack were sought after and killed in the following days. Burial of these bodies took place in at least four mass graves.

The first mass grave resulting from this attack was discovered behind the church where several bodies were left unburied and scattered. In December 1995, archaeologists surveyed the area and flagged any potential human remains. In January 1996, forensic anthropologists located and exhumed 53 skeletal assemblages. A second mass grave was found under a tree marked with wire, indicating a memorial. Below the tree was a trench filled with multiple bodies. The third and fourth mass graves were found using a probe to test for deteriorating remains. The third grave was marked by the local population, similar to the second grave. The fourth grave was identified by a priest.

Throughout the Rwandan genocide, bodies were buried in mass graves, left exposed, or disposed of through rivers. At least 40,000 bodies have been discovered in Lake Victoria which connects to Akagera River.

Khmer Rouge Genocide 

Mass grave mapping teams have located 125 Khmer Rouge prison facilities and corresponding gravesites to date in Cambodia while researching the Killing Fields. These mass graves are believed by villagers to possess tutelary spirits and signify the dead bodies becoming one with the earth. Buddhist rituals, which were taboo at the time, were performed in the 1980s which transformed the anonymous bodies into "spirits of the departed." In the 1990s, religious ceremonies were re-established and the Festival of the Dead was celebrated annually.

Holocaust 

The Mittelbau camps held about 60,000 prisoners of The Holocaust between August 1943 and March 1945. Conservative estimates assume that at least 20,000 inmates perished at the Mittelbau-Dora concentration camp. In early April 1945, an unknown number of prisoners perished in death marches following the evacuation of prisoners from Mittelbau camps to Bergen-Belsen concentration camp in northern Germany.

In April 1945, U.S. soldiers liberated the Mittelbau-Dora concentration camp. Only a few prisoners were still in the camp and the U.S. soldiers found the remains of approximately 1,300 prisoners in the Boelcke barracks. The names of these prisoners are unknown. Mass graves of the dead prisoners from the Mittelbau-Dora concentration camp were dug by German civilians under orders from U.S. soldiers.

Soviet mass killings

Communist regime massacres in Yugoslavia 

 Bleiburg repatriations
 Communist purges against Hungarians and Germans in Serbia in 1944-45
 Barbara Pit massacre
 Mass graves in Slovenia

Srebrenica massacre

Victims of the Srebrenica massacre were murdered by the Army of Republika Srpska and buried in mass graves. Serb forces used mass graves throughout the Bosnian War and thousands of victims remain unidentified as of 2017.

Famine

The Great Famine 
Ireland's Great Famine lasted from 1845 to 1849, a period wherein about one million people died. Because of the excessive number of deaths and extreme poverty, many families were unable to provide a wake or proper burial for loved ones and used mass graves instead. Archaeological excavations have taken place on Irish mass burial sites. One excavation revealed a mass grave of nearly 1,000 individuals. The skeletons within the grave were layered on top of each other in multiple sub-rectangular pits positioned less than a meter apart.

Epidemics and pandemics

Bubonic plague 

The bubonic plague outbreak existed in three pandemic waves and is known as the Black Death. In the 1300s alone, an estimated 20–30 million people were killed in Europe and approximately 12 million people were killed in China. These deaths were at least 30 percent of the European population at that time. The last major outbreak of the bubonic plague occurred in London from 1665–1666 and is known as The Great Plague.

In March 2013, a plague pit of 25 skeletons was found in a 5.5 meter-wide shaft during the construction of a new railroad in London. The skeletons were neatly lined up in two rows and were about 8 feet underground. Samples from 12 corpses were taken and forensic analysis confirmed traces of DNA from Yersinia pestis.

Spanish flu 
In several territories, the amount of death caused by the 1918 Spanish flu pandemic was beyond the capacities of funeral industry, requiring the use of mass graves.

Several mass graves of Spanish flu victims were created in Australia, Canada, and the United States.

COVID-19 
Reports of mass graves having been dug for COVID-19 victims have been made about Iran, using satellite pictures of sites near Qom as evidence.

In New York City, mass graves have been prepared in Hart Island for an afflux of dead; however, other reports said mass graves would be unlikely in the United States. University of Huddersfield experts said mass graves might be considered if local services end up overwhelmed. Following the rise of deaths and morgues being overwhelmed, New York City has temporarily allowed for mass graves on Hart Island for unclaimed bodies.

In Brazil, the city of Manaus, in the state of Amazonas, used mass graves after a large spike in deaths attributed to the pandemic.

Natural disaster

Brunner Mine disaster 
The Brunner Mine disaster occurred at 9:30 a.m. on March 26, 1896. An underground explosion caused the death of 65 miners, making it New Zealand's deadliest mining disaster. Of the 53 victims buried in Stillwater cemetery, 33 victims were in one mass grave.

2010 Haitian earthquake 
Following the 2010 Haiti earthquake, thousands of bodies were left in the streets on Port-au-Prince, exposed to the sun and beginning to decompose and smell. The government of Haiti collected the bodies on the street, along with rubble through use of dump trucks and other heavy machinery. The bodies and rubble were then transported to empty rectangular holes, 20 feet deep, 20 feet wide and 100 feet long. No efforts were taken to identify the dead that were transported and buried.

Within Haitian culture, burial rituals hold great significance and the sacred ceremonies can cost more than their own homes. There is a Haitian Vodou belief that the dead continue to live and are connected to their ancestors through these rituals. The burial of unidentified corpses in mass graves rather than familial plots severs this spiritual link between the living and dead.

2013 Typhoon Haiyan 
As the casualties of the Typhoon Haiyan were in the thousands, unidentified or unknown corpses were buried in several mass graves in Leyte (especially in Tacloban City where the most deaths happened), Samar and other areas, while identified corpses were given to their families for burial.

Health concerns 
The debate surrounding mass graves amongst epidemiologists includes whether or not, in a natural disaster, to leave corpses for traditional individual burials, or to bury corpses in mass graves. For example, if an epidemic occurs during winter, flies are less likely to infest corpses, reducing the risk of outbreaks of dysentery, diarrhea, diphtheria, or tetanus, which decreases the urgency to use mass graves. A research published in 2004 indicates that the health risks from dead bodies after natural disasters are relatively limited.

See also

Chemmani mass graves investigation
Crab Island (Lake Champlain)
Duffy's Cut
Duraiappa stadium mass grave
Guba mass grave
Maguindanao massacre
Mass graves in Chechnya
Mass graves in Iraq
Mass graves in Slovenia
Mirusuvil massacre
Plague pit
Potter’s field
Sooriyakanda mass grave
Srebrenica massacre
Trench
Vukovar massacre

References

External links
 
 Mass Graves of the Indonesian Massacres of 1965–66
 Video on the exhumation of a mass grave of World War II German soldiers in Villeneuve-Loubet, southern France, in 2006
 Mass Graves of Iraq
 Article about the effects of mass graves after the 2003 Iran earthquake.
 General article about mass graves
 Exhumation of WWII era mass graves of German and Soviet soldiers in Stalingrad

Emergency management
Cemeteries